James Finlayson may refer to:

James Finlayson (minister) (1758–1808), of the Church of Scotland
James Finlayson (industrialist) (1771–1852), Scottish Quaker who, in effect, took the Industrial Revolution to Tampere, Finland
James Finlayson (actor) (1887–1953), Scottish actor
James Finlayson (politician) (1823–1903), British Liberal Party politician
James Finlayson (surgeon) (1840–1906), Scottish physician and writer 
James Finlayson (martyr), 16th-century Scot, one of the Perth Martyrs
James Gordon Finlayson (born 1964), British philosopher